Dejan Mijatović (born September 14, 1968) is a Serbian professional basketball coach and former player who currently serves as the head coach for Borac Čačak of the Basketball League of Serbia.

Playing career
Mijatović played basketball for Borac Čačak, Borac Banja Luka, Zastava Kragujevac, Radnički Kragujevac, and Starogard Gdański (Poland).

Coaching career 
On 28 November 2022, Borac Čačak hired Mijatović as their new head coach.

Career achievements and awards
Assistant coach
 Radivoj Korać Cup winner: 2 (with FMP: 2002–03; with Partizan NIS: 2017–18)

Personal life 
His uncle is Radmilo Mišović, former basketball player.

References

External links
 Dejan Mijatović at beoexcell.net
 Dejan Mijatovic at ABA League
 Dejan Mijatovic at okkbeograd.org.rs

1968 births
Living people
Basketball players from Čačak
OKK Beograd coaches
KK Borac Banja Luka players
KK Borac Čačak coaches
KK Borac Čačak players
KK Radnički Kragujevac (1950–2004) players
KK Zastava players
KK Lions/Swisslion Vršac coaches
KK Lovćen coaches
Serbian expatriate basketball people in Bosnia and Herzegovina
Serbian expatriate basketball people in Poland
Serbian expatriate basketball people in Germany
Serbian expatriate basketball people in Montenegro
Serbian expatriate basketball people in the United Arab Emirates
Serbian men's basketball coaches
Serbian men's basketball players
Yugoslav men's basketball players